Živilė Balčiūnaitė (born 3 April 1979 in Vilnius) is a Lithuanian Marathon runner. Balčiūnaitė finished 4th at the 2006 European Athletics Championships in Gothenburg. She also competed in the same event at the 2004 Olympics, finishing 14th. She finished 11th at the 2008 Olympics.

Biography
In April 2011, the Athletics Federation of Lithuania announced Balčiūnaitė has been banned for two years for a positive drug test and will be stripped of her gold medal from Barcelona.  Balčiūnaitė has said she is innocent and said the positive drug test was a result of a drug prescription by her gynecologist, however the anti doping rules state that every athlete is responsible for their own medical use.

Achievements

References

External links
 

1979 births
Living people
Sportspeople from Vilnius
Lithuanian female long-distance runners
Athletes (track and field) at the 2004 Summer Olympics
Athletes (track and field) at the 2008 Summer Olympics
Olympic athletes of Lithuania
Lithuanian sportspeople in doping cases
Doping cases in athletics
Lithuanian female marathon runners